This is a list of countries by production in 2019, based on the Mineral Commodity Summary for 2020.

* indicates "Natural resources of COUNTRY or TERRITORY" links.

References 

Production
Mercury